Brassia pumila is a species of epiphytic orchid native to Guyana, Venezuela, French Guiana, Colombia, Peru, and Brazil.

References

External links
IOSPE orchid photos
AgrOriente (Moyobamba Perú), Orchídeas Amazonicas, Galería Virtual, Brassia pumila

pumila
Orchids of South America
Plants described in 1845